Francis Lewis Clark (June 21, 1861 – 1914?) was a prominent American industrialist. He disappeared on a business trip to Santa Barbara, California.

Career
In 1885 F. Lewis Clark established the C. & C. Mill and Elevator, the largest flouring mill in the Pacific Northwest. Mr. Clark was a founder of the America's Cup race, and sold the land and carried the contract for Louis Davenport to build his famed Davenport Hotel.

In 1898 Lewis Clark and his wife Winifred Clark retained the services of noted architect Kirtland Cutter to design a mansion on 7th Avenue in Spokane, Washington. This  mansion is currently used for offices, and retains its natural woodwork and original features. In 1910 Clark constructed a second mansion on Hayden Lake, Idaho, as a summer home. The "Honeysuckle Lodge" was the most expensive home in Idaho at the time. This home currently is a country inn known as The Clark House. The house was designed by George Canning Wales of Boston.

On May 10, 1904, Clark was a defendant in the case of "Chemung Mining Co vs Hanley."

In 1906, Clark was vice-president of Spokane's Inland Railway Island Co.

Disappearance

On January 16, 1914, F. Lewis Clark, his chauffeur and valet drove Winifred Clark to the train station. The train was scheduled to depart at 11:30 p.m. Lewis Clark kissed his wife goodbye, left the train and walked to the limousine. He dismissed his chauffeur and valet and walked into the night. Clark mysteriously disappeared and was never heard from again. According to a New York Times article from two days later, he was 'believed by police to have committed suicide by jumping from a pier' in Santa Barbara, and his hat had been found in the water. However, his body was never found. Winifred tried to manage the estate, but by 1922 she was forced to sell all of her possessions.

See also 
List of people who disappeared

References

External links
The Clark House
Enduring Mystery of F. Lewis Clark

1861 births
1910s missing person cases
1914 in California
American businesspeople
Missing person cases in California
People from Bangor, Maine
Year of death unknown